{|

{{Infobox ship career
|Hide header=
|Ship country=United States
|Ship flag=
|Ship name=USS General G. W. Goethals
|Ship namesake=George Washington Goethals (1858-1928), a U.S. Army officer and civil engineer (Previous name retained)
|Ship owner=
|Ship operator=
|Ship registry=
|Ship route=
|Ship ordered=
|Ship awarded=
|Ship builder=Bremer Vulkan, Vegesack, Germany
|Ship original cost=
|Ship yard number=
|Ship way number=
|Ship laid down=
|Ship launched=
|Ship sponsor=
|Ship christened=
|Ship completed=1911 or 1912 as the German commercial passenger-cargo ship SS Grunewald at Vegesack, Germany, by Bremer Vulkan. Before the United States entered World War I, she became an American ship owned by the Panama Railroad Steamship Company of New York City.  The U.S. Navy acquired her on 10 March 1919, assigned her the naval registry Identification Number (Id. No.) 1443, and commissioned her the same day at Hoboken, New Jersey, as USS General G. W. Goethals.

United States Navy service
Assigned to the Cruiser and Transport Force and operated by the Navy under a United States Army account, General G. W. Goethals spent the bulk of her commissioned Navy service ferrying supplies for American forces in Europe to France and bringing home troops of the American Expeditionary Force who had served in Europe during World War I. She made a number of voyages to Europe with supplies, and brought home nearly 3,000 troops.

On 21 August 1919, General G. W. Goethals departed Charleston, South Carolina, carrying supplies to New Orleans, Louisiana; Cristóbal, Panama Canal Zone; and San Juan, Puerto Rico. She completed this voyage by arriving at New York City on 13 September 1919.

On the day of her arrival in New York, General G. W. Goethals was decommissioned and turned over to the United States Department of War for return to the Panama Railroad Steamship Company.

Later career

The ship returned to commercial service as SS General G. W. Goethals.

Assistance to USS S-5

On 2 September 1920, General G. W. Goethals was off Cape May, New Jersey, on a voyage from Haiti to New York City when the wooden steamship Alanthus contacted her at about 18:00 by the use of signal flags. Making her last voyage, Alanthus earlier in the day had come across the disabled U.S. Navy submarine , which had sunk accidentally on 1 September 1920 during full-power trials off the Delaware Capes. The submarine's crew had partially refloated her, causing her to rise until only her stern broke the surface, but had been able to make only a tiny hole in her hull in their attempt to escape and remained trapped on board. Alanthus had rigged a pump to provide S-5s crew with air and had also provided the submarine's crew with fresh water and rigged cables to keep S-5s stern above water, but had been unable to help the crew enlarge the escape hole or, lacking a radio, to call for assistance until sighting General G. W. Goethals.Rear, Laura, "History of the USS S-Five Submarine," oceanexplorer.noaa.gov, undated.

General G. W. Goethals radioed the U.S. Navy with its first information about the submarine's plight and her crew immediately set about enlarging the escape hole. By 01:45 on 3 September 1920, the hole was big enough for S-5s crew to exit the submarine, and the last man to leave – S-5'''s commanding officer, Lieutenant Commander Charles M. "Savvy" Cooke, Jr. – safely emerged from the escape hole at 03:00. Although her crew was safe, the submarine was lost later on 3 September when she sank while under tow by the battleship .

The portion of S-5s hull plating that General G. W. Goethals removed to permit S-5s crew to escape from the submarine is on exhibit in the National Museum of the United States Navy in the Washington Navy Yard in Washington, D.C.

Sale
On 10 January 1925, the Panama Railroad Steamship Company sold General G. W. Goethals to the Universal Negro Improvement Association.

In 1925 or 1926 she was sold to the Munson Steamship Line and renamed Munorleans''. In 1929, she was operating on the New York–Brazil route.

See also
 
 NOAAS Whiting (S 329)

Notes

References

Department of the Navy: Naval Historical Center Online Library of Selected Images:  Civilian Ships: S.S. General G.W. Goethals (American Passenger-Cargo Steamer, 1911). Served as USS General G.W. Goethals (ID # 1443) in 1919
NavSource Online: Section Patrol Craft Photo Archive: General G. W. Goethals (ID 1443)

Ships built in Bremen (state)
1911 ships
Ships of the Hamburg America Line
Cargo ships of the United States Navy
Unique transports of the United States Navy
World War I cargo ships of the United States
World War I transports of the United States
Maritime incidents in 1920
Ships of the Black Star Line